The 2019 United Nations Security Council election was held on 7 June during the 73rd session of the United Nations General Assembly, held at United Nations Headquarters in New York City. The elections are for five non-permanent seats on the UN Security Council for two-year mandates commencing on 1 January 2020.

In accordance with the Security Council's rotation rules, whereby the ten non-permanent UNSC seats rotate among the various regional blocs into which UN member states traditionally divide themselves for voting and representation purposes, the five available seats are allocated as follows:

Two for Africa
One for the Asia-Pacific Group
One for Latin America and the Caribbean
One for the Eastern European Group

The five members will serve on the Security Council for the 2020–21 period.

Notably, St. Vincent and the Grenadines set a new record as the smallest ever Security Council member. Both St. Vincent and the Grenadines and Estonia were elected to the Council for the first time.

Candidates

African Group 
 (withdrawn)

Asia-Pacific Group

Eastern European Group

Latin American and Caribbean Group

Results

African and Asia-Pacific Groups

Latin American and Caribbean Group

Eastern European Group

See also
List of members of the United Nations Security Council
European Union and the United Nations
2019 in the United Nations

References

External links 

 Results of the election on YouTube

2019 elections
2019
Non-partisan elections